The Wech Baghtu wedding party airstrike refers to the killing of about 37 Afghan civilians, mostly women and children, and injuring about 27 others by a United States military airstrike on 3 November 2008.  The group was celebrating a wedding at a housing complex in the village of Wech Baghtu, a Taliban stronghold in the Shah Wali Kot District of Kandahar province, Afghanistan.

The airstrike followed a firefight breaking out between US troops and Taliban forces stationed on a mountain behind the wedding party. On 7 November 2008, Afghan officials said a joint investigation found that 37 civilians and 26 insurgents were killed in Wech Baghtu. Wedding parties in Afghanistan are segregated by sex; of the civilians, 23 were children, 10 were women, and 4 were men.  Another 27 persons were injured, including the bride. The bombing destroyed the housing complex where women and children had gathered to celebrate.

On 5 November 2008, Afghan President Hamid Karzai responded by demanding that newly-elected US President Barack Obama end civilian deaths, stating, "Our demand is that there will be no civilian casualties in Afghanistan. We cannot win the fight against terrorism with airstrikes – this is my first demand of the new president of the United States – to put an end to civilian casualties."

See also
Haska Meyna wedding party airstrike
Granai airstrike
Azizabad airstrike
 The Narang night raid
 Uruzgan helicopter attack
List of civilian casualties in the War in Afghanistan

References

External links 
Reuters video U.S. strike kills wedding party goers -Afghan officials.
Uncomfortable Others: Afghan Civilians Wounded by America Marc W. Herold
Examples of the US ‘liberation’ of Afghanistan

2008 in Afghanistan
Airstrikes during the War in Afghanistan (2001–2021)
Attacks on weddings
Civilian casualties in the War in Afghanistan (2001–2021)
History of Kandahar Province
Massacres in Afghanistan
Mass murder in 2008
November 2008 events in Asia
Attacks in Afghanistan in 2008